The John Lair House and Stables, at the northeast corner of U.S. Route 25 and Hummel Rd. in Renfro Valley, Kentucky, was built in 1944.  It was listed on the National Register of Historic Places in 1995.  The listing included two contributing buildings.

Its conceptual design was by John Lair;  the architect was Wayne W. Haffler.

See also
 John Lair House, near Shawhan, Kentucky, listed on the National Register in 1983
 E.L. Ehlen Livery and Sale Stable: National Register of Historic Places listing in Renfro Valley, Kentucky
 National Register of Historic Places listings in Rockcastle County, Kentucky

References

Houses on the National Register of Historic Places in Kentucky
Houses completed in 1944
National Register of Historic Places in Rockcastle County, Kentucky
1944 establishments in Kentucky
Agricultural buildings and structures on the National Register of Historic Places in Kentucky
Equine industry in Kentucky
Stables in the United States
Commercial buildings completed in 1944